Beach Vanderpool (October 25, 1808 – March 12, 1884) was an American politician who served as the Mayor of Newark from 1846 to 1848.

Biography 
Vanderpool was a member of a prominent family in Newark. He was one of the founders of the Morris and Essex Railroad and was a major shareholder at the time of his death. He was also the president of the Howard Savings Bank and Commissioner of the Morris Plains Lunatic Asylum. One of his sons, Eugene Vanderpool (1844–1903), was president of the Newark Gas Light Company.

References

1808 births
1884 deaths
American people of Dutch descent
Mayors of Newark, New Jersey
New Jersey Whigs
19th-century American politicians